John Trevanion (by 1483 – 1539 or later), of Dartmouth, Devon, was an English merchant and local administrator.

John Trevanion was chosen as Mayor of Dartmouth, Devon in 1512 and was again mayor in 1518–19, 1537–38 and 1538–39.

He was a Member (MP) of the Parliament of England for Dartmouth in 1529.

He married Joan, who was the widow of another Dartmouth merchant, Richard Holland.

References

15th-century births
16th-century deaths
Members of the Parliament of England for Dartmouth
English MPs 1529–1536